Cucumis prophetarum is a dioecious and prostrate or climbing perennial vine in the family Cucurbitaceae.

Distribution
Cucumis prophetarum is native to Mauritania east to the Horn of Africa and southwest to Angola, as well as northern South Africa, southern Mozambique, Comoros, and northern Egypt. It is also native to Israel, southern Lebanon, southern Saudi Arabia, Yemen, Oman, United Arab Emirates, and northwestern India. It has been introduced to Qatar.

Description

Its stems and leaves are hairy and the leaves are ovate to round in shape and cordate at the bases and measure 2–4 centimeters in length. They have 3–5 blunt-toothed lobes. Male flowers occur in clusters of 2–3 and are rarely solitary; female flowers are always solitary. They have five yellow petals. The fruit is slightly ovoid and is vertically striped and yellow in color when ripe. It measures 3–4 centimeters in length and is covered in spike-like pustules.

Uses
The fruit has a bitter flavor when raw and is sometimes boiled or pickled and the leaves are cooked and served with a staple.
The fruit is eaten across its native range and occasionally cultivated and sold in local markets.

The fruit is also used in folk medicine in Saudi Arabia to treat liver disorders and an extract from it has been proven to contain cytotoxicity against six cancer cell lines. Another extract from the fruit induces an anti-diabetic effect.

Synonyms
This species, Cucumis prophetarum L., has a name that other species may share:
Cucumis prophetarum Mey., a synonym for Citrullus naudinianus
Cucumis prophetarum Wall., a synonym for Cucumis callosus

See also
List of culinary fruits
List of culinary vegetables

References 

prophetarum
Flora of Mozambique
Flora of Egypt
Flora of Mauritania
Flora of Tanzania
Flora of South Africa
Flora of Angola
Taxa named by Carl Linnaeus
Plants described in 1759
Flora of Africa
Flora of Asia
Medicinal plants of Asia
Fruit vegetables
Vines
Dioecious plants
Fruits originating in Asia
Fruits originating in Africa
Medicinal plants of Africa
Leaf vegetables
Edible fruits